Bernathonomus minuta is a moth of the family Erebidae first described by Fragoso in 1953. It is found in Brazil.

References

Phaegopterina
Moths described in 1953